Dimitri Carlos Zozimar or simply Carlos (born February 16, 1988) is a Malagasy footballer. He currently plays in the Malaysia M3 League with Batu Dua. Previously, he played in the Championnat de France amateur for SO Romorantin, with his national teammate Claudio Ramiadamanana.

He has also previously played for AA Antsirabe.

External links

Profile by foot-national

1988 births
Living people
People from Antananarivo
Malagasy footballers
Madagascar international footballers
Malagasy expatriate footballers
Dimitri Carlos Zozimar
SO Romorantin players
Dimitri Carlos Zozimar
Expatriate footballers in Thailand
Expatriate footballers in France
Malagasy expatriate sportspeople in Thailand
Association football midfielders